Acraga chicana is a moth of the family Dalceridae. It is found in southern Mexico. The habitat consists of subtropical moist forests.

The length of the forewings is about 13 mm. The forewings are brownish orange and the hindwings are orange. Adults have been recorded on wing in January.

Etymology
The species name refers to the Chicana Ruins in Campeche, Mexico, the type locality.

References

Dalceridae
Moths described in 1994